"Let Me Touch Your Mind" is a song written by Oliver Sain. It was recorded and released by R&B duo Ike & Tina Turner on United Artists Records in 1972.

Recording and release 
"Let Me Touch Your Mind" was written by St. Louis musician Oliver Sain, who occasionally performed with Ike Turner's Kings of Rhythm. The song is a ballad about a plea to get a lover to let down their guard and be open with their feelings. Ike & Tina Turner recorded the track at their studio, Bolic Sound, in June 1972. The record was released in September 1972 as the lead single from their album Let Me Touch Your Mind. They promoted the song on The Dick Cavett Show in October 1972. It reached No. 30 on Record World's R&B chart. A live version was released on the album Live! The World of Ike & Tina (1973).

The B-side "Chopper" is a non-album track written by Tina Turner. It later appeared on the compilation album Funkier Than a Mosquito's Tweeter (2002).

Critical reception 
Cash Box (September 23, 1972): "Little Anthony intro segues into dynamic blues outing that is certain to grab top 40 attention. Tina Turner is absolutely incredible as she'll make a believer out of anyone."

Chart performance

References 

1972 songs
1972 singles
Ike & Tina Turner songs
United Artists Records singles
Rhythm and blues ballads
Song recordings produced by Ike Turner